A furry convention (also furry con or fur con) is a formal gathering of members of the furry fandom — people who are interested in the concept of fictional non-human animal characters with human characteristics. These conventions provide a place for fans to meet, exchange ideas, transact business and engage in entertainment and recreation centered on this concept. Originating in California, United States, during the mid-1980s, as of 2016 there are over 50 furry conventions worldwide each year.

As of 2017, the largest furry convention is Midwest FurFest in suburban Chicago, Illinois. It had a self-reported attendance of 13,641 in 2022.

Furry conventions offer a range of volunteer-led programming, usually focusing on anthropomorphic art, crafts, music and literature. Some raise money for charity. Attendees often dress up in fursuits and wear artistic name badges for identification, though the majority do not. They may also spend money on the work of amateur and professional artists, both directly and at auction.

Origin and growth
Furry conventions started in mid-1986 with parties at popular science fiction conventions, such as Westercon and BayCon in the San Francisco Bay Area. Over time, these parties split off into conventions of their own, starting with ConFurence 0 in 1989. Attendance at furry conventions has been growing, with the number of conventions, total attendance of all conventions and maximum size of a single convention all doubling over the period 2000–2006.

Furry conventions sometimes start out as furmeets, where groups of local fans meet at a regular location, often on a scheduled basis. As the local community grows, these groups may put on events that attract dealer attention or significant fan activity and which become recognized as fully-fledged conventions. Other conventions spring up in the wake of discontinued events; for example, Califur was founded in 2004 following the final ConFurence in 2003, in order to keep a furry convention in the Los Angeles Basin.

Activities

Convention programming includes presentations, panels, workshops and tutorials on anthropomorphic culture, from literature, fiction and art to science, technology and spirituality. The convention will often provide space for stand-up comedy routines by entertainers like Uncle Kage and Alkali Bismuth; filk music, many kinds of gaming, and roleplaying sessions, as well as numerous puppeteering and performing arts events. A unifying theme is common for larger events.

Most conventions will feature some kind of an art show, in which artists' work is displayed, often for direct purchase or auction during the convention. There will often be a "Dealers' Den" where art and comic book distributors and other merchants can sell their wares for a fee, and an Artists' Alley where individual artists are given space for no fee or a token fee, usually on the condition that they sell only their own work. Artists may also trade art between each other using sketchbooks. Erotic art is typically allowed if kept separate from other pieces, and shown only to adult attendees; a few conventions are rated strictly PG-13 but furry conventions are usually for all ages.

Individual transactions are relatively small (usually around US$10–$50 for sketches or badges, $10–$200 for auction pieces), but the total can approach US$100,000 at the largest events (excluding professional dealers).

Major conventions tend to have a rave on at least one evening. Often there is a "fursuit-friendly" dance prior to the main event, with raised lighting and slower music to offset fursuiters' reduced vision and mobility. The use of glowsticks and illuminated poi are popular once the lights are dimmed. A furry convention is also an opportunity to socialize, and private parties for subgroups of the fandom are common.

Conventions with significant numbers of fursuiters may offer an event known as the furry games, furry races, or critterlympics. These focus on feats of dexterity suited to multiple players in teams, such as dragging a sled filled with plush toys or other fursuiters around a marked track, or racing back and forth while tethered to one another with a hula hoop.

Some conventions have established charity auctions, which (in the US) usually raise several thousand dollars for the convention's yearly charity, typically a wildlife refuge, nature reserve, animal shelter, sanctuary or rescue group. Organizers may also donate from the convention's own funds. In total, furry conventions raised over US$50,000 for charity in 2006, with Further Confusion and Anthrocon raising over US$60,000 throughout their history.

Attendees

Attendees include artists and dealers offering products and services for sale to fans, and those who wish to buy them. Others come for the programming, or to meet friends or other furry fans in general. Many attend for all of these reasons. Some later publish a con report detailing their experiences.

Attendees of major conventions receive a bag with the convention book (or conbook), a lavishly illustrated volume featuring themed artwork, fiction and articles submitted by members and the Guests of Honor, along with a description of the event's programming, staff, rules, guests and any charity being supported by the convention. Local restaurant information and a combination pocket schedule and map may also be included. Sponsors often receive additional items such as T-shirts, pins or ribbons, as well as faster registration badge pick-up and on-site meals (some conventions provide a con suite with basic refreshments for all members). They may also be displayed prominently in convention publications.

Fans may wear a full or partial fursuit or another costume to express their identity and entertain others, though typically less than 15% of attendees bring a costume, and few of these wear them all the time. Others may wear accessories such as ears or a tail, particularly outside the main convention area. Nearly all will wear one or more custom convention badges featuring a depiction of their anthropomorphic persona, some with attached ribbons providing an indicator of social status, such as a notice of affiliation, or sponsorship of the convention. Sales of such accessories form a part of the commerce at furry conventions.

Attendees under the age of majority are commonly allowed  to attend with a notarized parental permission slip or accompanied by an adult. European and Australian conventions usually only admit those above 18. Underage attendees are usually given a distinctive badge to allow staff and dealers to restrict access to mature content. Government-issued photo ID is usually required.

Organization and staffing

Furry conventions are usually run and staffed by volunteers, though venues may require certain activities to be contracted out. Event funding typically relies on convention registrations. Many of the larger conventions are incorporated as non-profit organizations, usually to achieve tax-exempt status and safeguard the organizers' personal assets - in the US, some are 501(c)(3) charities, while others are registered as recreational clubs. The largest events may require up to a hundred volunteers, not including gofers. Volunteers are thanked for their participation during the closing ceremonies, which are usually well-attended, and often receive T-shirts or other benefits.

Timing and duration
Most furry conventions take place over a weekend, with events scheduled between Friday evening and Sunday afternoon.  Saturday is typically the busiest day, as most fans must return home on Sunday.  One-day passes are sometimes sold at a reduced price.

Reasons for this include:
 Most fans would have to take a vacation from work or study to attend an event held during the workweek.
 Transportation costs are often lower for weekend travelers.
 Hotels have few business travelers during the weekend, making it much easier to reserve a block of rooms and secure space for programming at a reduced price. 
Many fans are students and have little discretionary income, so hotel and convention fees are important factors.

As a given convention expands in growth over the years, increased demand for programming often results in events scheduled late into the night.  Convention activities may also be extended to Thursday and early Friday for early arrivals.  Unofficial activities are frequently coordinated by groups of people on Sunday evening and Monday morning, usually open to anyone who wishes to join, and may include bowling, bar hopping, visits to arcades, shopping malls, theme parks, zoos, dinner or morning brunch.

Media and public perception

One public misconception, popularized by the CSI episode "Fur and Loathing", is that furry conventions are places for people to dress up as animals and perform sexual acts with each other. In an article about furries, Vanity Fair described some hotel guests as "stunned", with some calling convention-goers "freaks", "blatant homosexuals", and various derogatory terms. Some U.S. Army personnel present during the same convention described attendees as "a little unusual" and "people that have problems", while others considered the event "something nice to bring kids to."
In 2014 Midwest FurFest convention was disrupted by a chlorine gas attack which left 19 attendees hospitalized. The investigation by Rosemont Police revealed that the attack was most likely an intentional act of crime against the furry fandom.

Events

Active events

Discontinued events

References

External links

Map of active furry conventions
List of furry convention resources at WikiFur

FurryCons.com

1986 introductions

Furry fandom
Contexts for auctions